PIW may refer to:

 Public Interest Watch, a US group that claims to fight charitable trust abuse 
 Pikwitonei Airport, the IATA code for the airport in Canada
 PIW or Państwowy Instytut Wydawniczy (State Publishing Institute), Polish publishing house founded in 1946
 pounds per inch width, an imperial measure 
 Person in water, a term used by water rescue teams in the case of a Man overboard.

pl:PIW